Sole custody is a child custody arrangement whereby only one parent has custody of a child. In the most common use of the term, sole custody refers to a context in which one parent has sole physical custody of a child.

Types of custody 
Depending upon the jurisdiction, custody may be divided into two components, legal custody and physical custody. Physical custody relates to the child's legal domicile and where the child resides. Legal custody involves the parents' participation in important life decisions pertaining to the child, such as significant medical decisions or where the child attends school. It is not uncommon for a parent with sole physical custody to share legal custody with the other parent, but it is uncommon for parents to share physical custody while one parent has sole legal custody.

History
Historically, sole custody was the most common form of child custody granted after divorce. Since the 1980s, joint physical custody with shared parenting have become much more common, and in some jurisdictions there is a legislative preference or presumption in favor of joint legal custody, joint physical custody or both. Research indicates that children fare better in joint custody arrangements, or custody arrangements that allow a child to have good access to both parents.

See also
Alternating custody
Bird's nest custody
Child custody
Divorce
Family law
Family court
Parens patriae
Parenting plan
Shared parenting
Split custody
Third-party custody
Ward of the state

References

Child custody
Juvenile law
Divorce
Family law
Marriage
Parenting
Fathers' rights